George Marton (1801 – 24 November 1867) was an English Conservative Party politician from Lancashire.

At the 1837 general election, Marton was elected as Member of Parliament (MP) for Lancaster. He held the seat until he stood down from the House of Commons at the 1847 general election.

In the 1820s, Marton's family built the stately home Capernwray Hall, near Carnforth. He served as High Sheriff of Lancashire in 1858.

His son George Blucher Heneage Marton was briefly MP for Lancaster from 1885 to 1886.

References

External links 

1801 births
1867 deaths
People from Carnforth
Conservative Party (UK) MPs for English constituencies
UK MPs 1837–1841
UK MPs 1841–1847
High Sheriffs of Lancashire